Vladivostok Air operates the following scheduled and charter services (as of December 2012):

Africa

North Africa
Egypt
 Hurghada – Hurghada International Airport Charter
 Sharm El Sheikh – Sharm El Sheikh International Airport Charter

Asia

Central Asia
Uzbekistan
 Tashkent – Tashkent International Airport

East Asia
China
 Beijing – Beijing Capital International Airport
 Dalian – Dalian Zhoushuizi International Airport
 Harbin – Harbin Taiping International Airport
 Tianjin – Tianjin Binhai International Airport Charter
Hong Kong
 Hong Kong International Airport
Japan
 Tokyo – Narita International Airport
Korea
 Busan – Gimhae International Airport
 Seoul – Incheon International Airport

Southeast Asia
Indonesia
 Bali – Ngurah Rai International Airport CharterSingapore
 Singapore – Singapore Changi Airport

Europe
Central Europe
Austria
 Salzburg – Salzburg Airport Charter

Eastern Europe
Russia
 Abakan – Abakan Airport
 Blagoveshchensk – Ignatyevo Airport
 Chita – Kadala Airport
 Irkutsk – Irkutsk International Airport
 Kavalerovo – Kavalerovo Airport
 Khabarovsk – Khabarovsk Novy Airport Hub Krasnoyarsk – Yemelyanovo Airport
 Magadan – Magadan Airport
 Moscow – Sheremetyevo International Airport Hub Novosibirsk – Tolmachevo Airport
 Petropavlovsk-Kamchatsky – Petropavlovsk-Kamchatsky Airport  
 Plastun – Plastun Airport
 Vladivostok – Vladivostok International Airport Hub'''
 Ulan-Ude – Ulan-Ude Airport
 Yakutsk – Yakutsk Airport
 Yuzhno-Sakhalinsk – Yuzhno-Sakhalinsk Airport

Southern Europe
Greece
 Heraklion – Heraklion International Airport CharterSpain
 Barcelona – Barcelona–El Prat Airport CharterTurkey
 Antalya – Antalya Airport CharterOceania
Micronesia
 Northern Mariana Islands
 Saipan – Saipan International Airport Charter''

References

External links
 Vladivostok Air

Russia transport-related lists
Lists of airline destinations
Aviation in the Russian Far East